Katsiaryna Belanovich (née Artsiukh; born October 14, 1991) is a Belarusian hurdler. She competed at the 2016 Summer Olympics in the women's 400 metres hurdles race; her time of 56.55 seconds in the heats did not qualify her for the semifinals.

She originally won a won gold medal at the 2010 World Junior Championships in Athletics, but was subsequently disqualified for doping.

See also
List of doping cases in athletics

References

External links

1991 births
Living people
Belarusian female hurdlers
Olympic female hurdlers
Olympic athletes of Belarus
Athletes (track and field) at the 2016 Summer Olympics
Belarusian sportspeople in doping cases
Doping cases in athletics